The 1916 United States presidential election in Maryland took place on November 7, 1916, as part of the 1916 United States presidential election which was held throughout all contemporary 48 states. Voters chose eight representatives, or electors to the Electoral College, who voted for president and vice president.

With its history as a slave state and substantial historic secessionist support, Maryland had been strongly Democratic during the Third Party System despite having Federalist and Whig tendencies under previous systems. However, hostility towards William Jennings Bryan’s free silver and Populist tendencies in the cities meant that the state shifted Republican in 1896 and became very close in subsequent elections during the “System of 1896”. Unlike former Confederate states and Oklahoma, Maryland did not succeed in disenfranchising its large black population despite several attempts, which helped the Republicans remain highly competitive in early twentieth-century state elections.

The previous three elections had seen Maryland as the strongest Democratic state outside the former Confederacy. Despite this, and the fact that four members of the state’s Progressive Party committee refused to endorse the reunified Republicans under Charles Evans Hughes, leading GOP Senator Reed Smoot said late in September that he was confident Maryland could go Republican, although the poll still suggested Wilson would win narrowly. Wilson did not campaign in the state at all, but Hughes’ campaign made a brief visit during the second week of October, which was not regarded as successful.

Two days before the poll, Maryland was regarded as doubtful, although there had been reports of a continued swing to Wilson a week previously. As it turned out, the earlier prediction proved the better guide, with Wilson winning by 8.02 percent for his strongest performance in any antebellum Union state, and becoming the first Democrat to win an absolute majority in Maryland since Grover Cleveland in 1892. In this election, Maryland voted 4.9% more Democratic than the nation at-large.

Results

Results by county

Counties that flipped from Democratic to Republican
Allegany

Counties that flipped from Progressive to Republican
Garrett

See also
 United States presidential elections in Maryland
 1916 United States presidential election
 1916 United States elections

Notes

References 

Maryland
1916
Presidential